The following lists the highest-grossing film adaptations based on video games, including live-action and animated films. Films such as Wreck-It Ralph, Pixels, and Ready Player One are inspired by video games, but are not adapted from any actual video game, so are not included. Any types of video games such as visual novels and digital pets are included, with the exception of physical games or outside of video games like Dungeons & Dragons and Ouija are not included.

, Warcraft is the highest-grossing film adaptation based on video games, while Pokémon is the highest-grossing film franchise based on video games.

List of highest-grossing video game film adaptations

Highest-grossing video game films by year

Timeline of highest-grossing video game films 
At least seven films have held the record of 'highest-grossing film of all time based on a video game' since the 1993 film Super Mario Bros. assumed the top spot.

 Two of the films, Super Mario Bros. and Pokémon: The First Movie, are based on Nintendo video games.
 Pokémon: The First Movie is the only animated film to do so.
 Each three early films are the first time to do so in three consecutive years (1993-1995) in mid-1990s to held.

Timeline of biggest opening weekends for video game films

Highest-grossing film series and film franchises based on video games 

The following is a list of the highest-grossing film series and film franchises based on video games.

Video game films by number of box office admissions 

The following table lists known estimated box office ticket sales for various high-grossing video games films that have sold more than 1million tickets worldwide.

Note that some of the data are incomplete due to a lack of available admissions data from a number of countries. Therefore, it is not an exhaustive list of all the highest-grossing video game films by ticket sales, so no rankings are given.

Highest-grossing video game films by markets

Biggest opening weekends for a video game film
The following is a list of video games movies which have opened to more than $10 million.

 * = North America only
  = China only

See also 
 List of films based on video games
 List of best-selling video game franchises
 List of best-selling video games

Notes

References

Franchise and series sources
 Pokémon
 1998 film: 
 1999 film: 
 2000 film: 
 2001 film: 
 2002 film: 
 2003 film: 
 2004 film: 
 2005 film: 
 2006 film: 
 2007 film: 
 2008 film: 
 2009 film: 
 2010 film: 
 2011 film: 
 2012 film: 
 2013 film: 
 2014 film: 
 2015 film: 
 2016 film: 
 2017 film: 
 2018 film: 
 2019 film: 
 2020 film: 

Video games
Video games